5477 Holmes, provisional designation , is a Hungaria asteroid and binary system from the innermost regions of the asteroid belt, approximately  in diameter. It was discovered on 27 October 1989, by American astronomer Eleanor Helin at the Palomar Observatory in California. The presumed E-type asteroid is likely spherical in shape and has a short rotation period of 2.99 hours. It was named for American amateur astronomer Robert Holmes. The discovery of its 1-kilometer-sized minor-planet moon was announced in November 2005.

Orbit and classification 

Holmes is a core member of the Hungaria family, a large family of bright asteroids that forms the innermost dense concentration of asteroids in the Solar System, as the Mars-crosser and near-Earth populations are much more sparse. The family is part of the larger dynamical group with the same name. It orbits the Sun in the innermost asteroid belt at a distance of 1.8–2.1 AU once every 2 years and 8 months (970 days; semi-major axis of 1.92 AU). Its orbit has an eccentricity of 0.08 and an inclination of 23° with respect to the ecliptic. The body's observation arc begins with its official discovery observation at Palomar in October 1989.

Physical characteristics 

Holmes is an assumed E-type asteroid, which agrees with the overall spectral type for members of the Hungaria family.

Rotation period 

Since 2005, several rotational lightcurves of Holmes have been obtained from photometric observations by Brian Warner and Petr Pravec in collaboration with other astronomers. Analysis of the best-rated lightcurve gave a well-defined rotation period of 2.9940 hours with a consolidated brightness amplitude between 0.10 and 0.12 magnitude, which indicates that the body has a nearly spherical shape. The asteroid's short period is near that of a fast rotator.

Diameter and albedo 

According to the survey carried out by the NEOWISE mission of NASA's Wide-field Infrared Survey Explorer (WISE), Holmes measures 3.147 kilometers in diameter and its surface has an albedo of 0.31, while the Collaborative Asteroid Lightcurve Link adopts Petr Pravec's revised WISE-data, that is, an albedo of 0.2849 and a diameter of 3.21 kilometers based on an absolute magnitude of 14.445. Johnston's Archive derives a diameter of 2.95 and 3.15 kilometers for the primary only and for the combined system, respectively.

Satellite 

The discovery was announced immediately on 15 November 2005. The mutual occultation events indicated the presence of a satellite 37% the size of its primary, which translates into an estimated diameter of  kilometers depending on the underlying size estimate of the primary.

Naming 

This minor planet was named after American amateur astronomer Robert E. Holmes Jr (born 1956), who directs the Astronomical Research Observatory  in Westfield, Illinois. The official naming citation was suggested by Sergio Foglia and published by the Minor Planet Center on 18 February 2011.

Notes

References

External links 
 CBET 288, Central Bureau for Astronomical Telegrams, 15 November 2005
 Asteroids with Satellites, Robert Johnston, johnstonsarchive.net
 Asteroid Lightcurve Database (LCDB), query form (info )
 Dictionary of Minor Planet Names, Google books
 Discovery Circumstances: Numbered Minor Planets (5001)-(10000) – Minor Planet Center
 
 

005477
Discoveries by Eleanor F. Helin
Named minor planets
005477
19891027